Kemi (Swedish (historically): Kiemi) is a town and municipality of Finland. It is located very near the city of Tornio and the Swedish border. It was founded in 1869 by a decree of the Emperor Alexander II of Russia because of its proximity to a deepwater port.

History

World War II hostage crisis

During World War II, after Finland signed the Moscow Armistice and found itself involved in the Lapland War against its former German ally, German forces at the beginning of October 1944 captured 132 Finnish civilian hostages in Kemi (as well as 130 in Rovaniemi) and threatened to kill them unless the Finnish army released the German POWs captured in the Battle of Tornio. However, Finland refused to comply and threatened to retaliate by killing the German POWs. The hostages were released unharmed on October 11, 1944, near Rovaniemi.

Geography 
Kemi is situated on the Bothnian Bay, at the mouth of the river Kemijoki, and it is part of the Lapland region.

Climate

Economy

The main economic activity in Kemi is centered on two large paper and woodpulp mills and on the only chromium mine in Europe (which supplies the Outokumpu ferrochrome plant in Tornio).

The Chinese company Kaidi has announced plans to build the world's first second-generation biomass plant in Kemi, scheduled to begin operations in 2019.

In April 2007, the city of Kemi laid off all of its municipal workers for 2 weeks due to the failing economy of the city. Spiraling specialist healthcare costs and a fleeing industry tax base are stated as the cause for the firing. These are the most drastic temporary dismissals to take place in Finland since 2000.

Sights 

Kemi has a claim to fame as the home of the world's largest snow castle (reconstructed every year to a different design). The SnowCastle of Kemi is usually built in the inner harbor of the city.

A model of The Crown of Finland (the original was never made for the King of Finland) is kept in the town's gemstone gallery. It also houses replicas of the Imperial State Crown of Great Britain, the scepter of the Czar of Russia, the Orbs of Denmark, and the diamond necklace of Marie Antoinette, among other items.

Additional attractions include:
Kemi church
Kemi Gemstone Gallery
Icebreaker Sampo
The sailship Jähti

Culture
Kemi is the hometown of the power metal band Sonata Arctica.

Politics 
Results of the 2019 Finnish parliamentary election in Kemi:

Left Alliance 26.2%
Social Democratic Party 23.6%
The Finns Party 19.8%
Center Party 13.6%
National Coalition Party 7.2%
Green League 5.1%
Movement Now 1.8% 
Christian Democrats 0.7%
Communist Worker‘s Party - For Peace and Socialism 2,7%

Town manager

Transportation

Kemi railway station is an intermediate station on the railway between Lapland and Helsinki. It is operated by VR. The junction of the Kolari and Rovaniemi lines lies to the north of Kemi station.

Finnish national road 4 and European routes E8 and E75 run through the town.

The Port of Kemi is a cargo port handling containerised and bulk cargo as well as oil and petrochemical products.

Education
A polytechnic university of applied sciences is situated in Kemi.

Notable residents 
 Juhani Paasivirta (1919–1993), Finnish historian
 Ensio Seppänen (1924–2008), Finnish sculptor and professor
 Anna-Liisa Tiekso (1929–2010), Finnish politician

International relations

Twin towns – sister cities
Kemi is twinned with:
 Tromsø (Norway), since 1940
 Volgograd (Russia), since 1953
 Liptovský Mikuláš (Slovakia)
 Newtownards (Northern Ireland)
 Székesfehérvár (Hungary)
 Luleå (Sweden)

See also 
1949 Kemi strike

References

External links 

 Town of Kemi – Official website

 
Cities and towns in Finland
Populated coastal places in Finland
Grand Duchy of Finland
Mining towns in Finland
Port cities and towns in Finland
Populated places established in 1869
1869 establishments in the Russian Empire